Harry Francis Vincent Edward (15 April 1898 – 8 July 1973) was a British runner. He competed in the 100 and 200 m 1920 Summer Olympics in Antwerp and won bronze medals in both events, becoming the first black person to gain Olympic medals. He injured himself during the 200 m final and therefore withdrew from the 4 × 100 m relay. Within the UK Edward won the AAA championships in the 100 yd and 220 yd in 1920–1922, and in 1922 also took the 440 yd title.

Personal life
The only son of a Guyanese father and German mother, a Prussian piano teacher, Edward was raised in Germany. His father had left Dominica as a cabin boy and then worked in Germany in a circus and then as the maitre d' in Berlin restaurants. He had one sister, Irene. Brought up and educated in Germany, he spoke English, German and French and was noted for his athletic and academic ability.

He was married twice: to Antoinette Kohler Regner, a Swiss national, in 1922 with one stepson, the marriage failed in 1931 after he emigrated to the United States in 1923; and to Gladys Hirst in 1938 with whom he had a son.

In 1973 he died after suffered a heart attack when visiting his sister in Germany.

Athletic career
In June 1914, when he was 16, he competed in an athletics meeting held in the stadium built for the 1916 Olympics and won the 200m and was placed second in the 100m to the German champion. However, when the First World War started, from 1915 he was imprisoned as a prisoner of war at Ruhleben internment camp in Germany for the majority of World War I. Although initially he was able to participate in sports days and made lasting friendships, conditions became poor, especially towards the end of the war, in terms of both food and the attitude of the Germans to the prisoners.

In late 1918 Edward was released from the camp and emigrated to Great Britain. he arrived in London, and, having gained qualifications while in the camp, became a teacher of German and French. He also became involved with amateur athletics again. He was successful at his first track meeting at Stamford Bridge. He was so successful at the sprint events at the Amateur Athletics Association meeting in 1920 that he was selected for the 100m, 200m and sprint relay team at the 1920 Antwerp Olympic Games. He reached the final of the 100m and 200m and gained a bronze medal in both, becoming the first black person to gain an Olympic medal. The start of the 100m race was confused with several competitors left at the starting line. He competed in British AAA meetings in 1921 and 1922. He won many races, including ones he was invited to enter. However, in 1922, in the main AAA meeting, he gained first place in the 100, 200 and 400-yard finals, when the finals in all these races were run within one hour. This achievement has never been superseded. His success was congratulated in person by King George V.

In 1923 he was invited to compete in New York's Yankee Stadium so emigrated to the USA. However his athletics performance in the USA was less successful.

Life in America
He moved to Philadelphia, returning to New York City after he had divorced and remarried. He initially worked at the Federal Theatre Project as an administrator, that included in 1936 the first staging of Macbeth with a black cast directed by John Houseman and Orson Welles. During the Second World War he worked for the Office of Price Administration and organised rationing. When the war ended worked for the United Nations Relief and Rehabilitation Administration and was sent to Greece. He subsequently worked for the New York Employment Office until he retired in the late 1960s. He continued as a volunteer including working abroad. He went to Vietnam to initiate a US sponsored foster-children programme.  He also greeted worked dignitaries visiting the UN and the New York mayor's office.

Legacy
The Harry Edward Papers, including correspondence, photographs, and other personal papers, are curated at the Amistad Research Center in New Orleans. They include his autobiography When I Passed the Statue of Liberty I Became Black. For a more complete description, see the finding aid for the collection.

References

External links
The remarkable story of Harry Edward: Britain’s first black Olympian in The Guardian

1898 births
1973 deaths
British male sprinters
German male sprinters
Black British sportspeople
Athletes (track and field) at the 1920 Summer Olympics
Olympic athletes of Great Britain
Olympic bronze medallists for Great Britain
Athletes from Berlin
German people of Guyanese descent
English people of Guyanese descent
English people of German descent
Medalists at the 1920 Summer Olympics
Olympic bronze medalists in athletics (track and field)
English expatriates in the United States
German expatriates in the United States
Federal Theatre Project people